Dibamus dalaiensis is a legless lizard endemic to Cambodia.

References

Dibamus
Reptiles of Cambodia
Reptiles described in 2011